Alderaan may refer to:

Alderaan, a fictional planet in the Star Wars universe
Alderaan (astronomy), a former name for a group of stars in the constellation of Gemini

Alderaan may also refer to:

Alderan, a character in the Hungarian epic poem The Siege of Sziget
the fictional Aldaran family in the Darkover series of books

See also
Aldebaran, a star in the constellation of Taurus
Alderano, a given name